Levenshulme railway station is in Levenshulme, Manchester, England.

Four tracks go through the station, with the centre tracks used by fast trains and the outer by stopping trains.

Services

As of December 2022, there are four trains per hour from Levenshulme in each direction during off-peak weekday hours and all day Saturdays.

Signage

As well as English, the platform signs give the station name in Irish and Urdu, reflecting the immigrant communities from Ireland and Pakistan which live in the area.

References

Further reading

External links

 Voices - Friends of Levenshulme station BBC Where I Live Manchester website

Railway stations in Manchester
DfT Category E stations
Former London and North Western Railway stations
Northern franchise railway stations